Aunt Louisa's Bible Picture Book is a book by Laura Valentine released in 1887 and containing stories like "The Story of King David", "Joseph and His Brethren" and "Wonders of Providence".

References

External links 

1887 short story collections
Children's short story collections
British short story collections
British children's books
Books based on the Bible
1880s children's books